Stable Mates is a split album by A. K. Salim and Yusef Lateef recorded in 1957 for the Savoy label.

Reception

AllMusic awarded the album 4½ stars.

Track listing
Side One:
All compositions by Yusef Lateef
 "Beauregard" - 3:20
 "Ameena" - 7:00
 "G' Bouk" - 10:00
Side Two:
All compositions by A. K. Salim
 "A Private Cloud" - 4:40
 "Dejeuner" - 6:20
 "Black Talk" - 3:38
 "D Minor Dipper" - 5:16

Personnel 
Side One:
Yusef Lateef - tenor saxophone, flute, arghul, percussion
Curtis Fuller - trombone
Hugh Lawson - piano
Ernie Farrow - bass, rebab
Louis Hayes - drums, percussion
Side Two:
A. K. Salim - arranger, director
Johnny Coles - trumpet
Buster Cooper - trombone
Johnny Griffin - tenor saxophone
Howard Austin - baritone saxophone
Tommy Flanagan - piano
Kenny Burrell - guitar
George Duvivier - bass
Osie Johnson - drums

References 

1957 albums
A. K. Salim albums
Yusef Lateef albums
Savoy Records albums
Albums produced by Ozzie Cadena